Sarat Chandra Bose (Bengali: শরৎচন্দ্র বসু) (6 September 1889 – 20 February 1950) was an Indian barrister and independence activist.

Early life
He was born to Janakinath Bose (father) and Prabhabati Devi in Cuttack, Odisha on 6 September 1889. The family originally hailed from Kodalia (now Subhashgram), South 24 Parganas, West Bengal. He belonged to the kulin Kayastha family. His father was descended from the Boses of Mahinagar (South 24 Parganas) while his mother Prabhabati Devi was part of the famous Dutt family of Hatkhola in north Kolkata. She gave birth to fourteen children, six daughters and eight sons, among whom were leftist leader Sarat Chandra Bose, Netaji Subhas Chandra Bose and distinguished cardiologist Dr. Sunil Chandra Bose. Sarat had two elder sisters. They were Pramilabala Mitra and Saralabala Dey. He had an elder brother, Satish Chandra Bose. He had six younger brothers, namely: Suresh Chandra Bose, Sudhir Chandra Bose, Dr. Sunil Chandra Bose (1894 — 17 November 1953), Subhas Chandra Bose (23 January 1897 — 18 August 1945), Sailesh Chandra Bose and Santosh Chandra Bose. He had four younger sisters, they were Tarubala Roy, Malina Dutt, Protiva Mitra, and Kanaklata Mitra.

Sarat Bose studied in Presidency College, Scottish Church College, then affiliated with the University of Calcutta, and then went to England in 1911 to become a barrister. He was called to the bar at Lincoln's Inn. He began a successful legal practice upon his return to India, but later abandoned it to join the Indian independence movement.

Political career
In 1936, Bose became the President of the Bengal Pradesh Congress Committee, and served as a member of the All India Congress Committee from 1936 till 1947. Sarat Bose was arrested after the escape of Subhas the day before he was due to join as Cabinet Minister in the Fazlul Haq government. He was moved to jail in Mercara and then Coonoor where his health suffered. He was released in September 1945 after a 4 year prison sentence. From 1946 to 1947, Bose would lead the Congress delegation to the Central Legislative Assembly. He strongly supported the formation of the Indian National Army by Subhash Chandra Bose and actively participated in the Quit India movement. Following his brother's reported death in 1945, Bose led efforts to provide relief and aid to the families of INA soldiers through the INA Defence and Relief Committee. In 1946, he was appointed Member of the Interim Government for Works, Mines and Powers – the position of a minister in a national executive council led by Jawaharlal Nehru and Sardar Vallabhbhai Patel, and presided over by the Viceroy of India.

Bengal partition and later life
However, Bose resigned from the AICC in disagreement over the Cabinet Mission Plan's call to partition Bengal between Hindu-majority and Muslim-majority regions. He attempted to construct a bid for a United Bengal and which is united but independent Bengal and North-East with the Bengali Muslim League leaders Huseyn Shaheed Suhrawardy and Abul Hashim. Muhammad Ali Jinnah (President of the Muslim League, who became Pakistan's founding father) supported it. Mahatma Gandhi also supported it. The Indian National Congress and the Hindu members of Indian Legislative Council from Bengal opposed it. After India's independence, Bose led his brother's Forward Bloc and formed the Socialist Republican Party, advocating a socialist system for Bengal and India. He died on 20 February 1950, in Calcutta when he was 60 years old.

Family
Sarat Bose married Bivabati Dey, the daughter of Akhoy Kumar Dey and Subala Dey, in 1909. The couple had eight children. Their children included Asoke Nath Bose, a Doctorate in Chemistry from Germany and eminent engineer; Amiya Nath Bose who participated in the Quit India Movement, became a Member of Parliament, and was also the Indian ambassador to Burma; Sisir Kumar Bose, who became a pediatrician and Member of Legislative Assembly, and Subrata Bose, who was an electrical engineer and also a Member of Parliament. His youngest daughter, Prof. Chitra Ghosh, is a distinguished academician, a social scientist, and also a member of the Parliament. His elder grandson, Sugata Bose, is a Gardiner Professor of Oceanic History and Affairs at Harvard University and a former member of the Lok Sabha. His younger grandson, Sumantra Bose, is a Professor of Comparative Politics at the London School of Economics and Political Science.

Honours
A statue of Sarat Chandra Bose is situated beside Calcutta High Court.

In January 2014, Sarat Chandra Bose Memorial Lecture was instituted, and the maiden lecture was delivered by historian of International fame Leonard A. Gordon - who has penned a joint biography of Sarat and his younger brother Subhas, titled Brothers Against The Raj.

References

External links

Indian independence activists from Bengal
Indian barristers
1889 births
1950 deaths
Members of the Central Legislative Assembly of India
Presidency University, Kolkata alumni
University of Calcutta alumni
Bengali Hindus
20th-century Bengalis
Politicians from Kolkata
West Bengal politicians
20th-century Indian lawyers
People from Kolkata
20th-century Indian politicians
All India Forward Bloc politicians